Corners may refer to:
 A community formed at a crossroads or other intersection; a few examples include:
 Balcom Corners, New York
 Bells Corners in Ottawa
 Dixon's Corners, Ontario
 Five Corners, Wisconsin (disambiguation), any of three communities of that name
 Hales Corners, Wisconsin
 Hallers Corners, Michigan
 Layton Corners, Michigan
 Corners, a variation on the Four Seasons card game
 Corners (TV series), 1980s BBC children's television series
 Corners, Perry County, Missouri, an unincorporated community

See also
 Corner (disambiguation)